Istiqlal Ahmad, is a Bahraini actress and media personality of Iraqi origin. She was born and raised in Kuwait, but moved Bahrain after her marriage and stayed there since.

Biography
Ahmad was born a few months after Kuwait gained its independence, the source of her first name (from the Arabic word for “independence”). Her brother is the actor Kazem Al-Zamil. She was interested in the arts from an early age, participating actively in school theatre productions. After graduating from high school, she enrolled at the local Higher Institute of Dramatic Arts, majoring in theatre, literature, and criticism.

Performing career
Ahmad’s first public role was a 1975 teleplay entitled منى (“Mona”), which she starred in at the age of fourteen. However, her breakthrough role was in Darb al-Zalaq, a seminal 1977 satire in which she co-starred with Abdulhussain Abdulredha. This began a string of high-profile roles continuing through the 1988 serial الرجال لعبتهم النقود (“The Men Have Placed Their Bets”), her last role before she left for Bahrain.

Marriage and retirement
After marrying a Bahraini broadcaster, she left for Bahrain and retired from acting. They had five children, including two sons and three daughters. She continued participating in media, however, and is a broadcaster and published poet.

In 1992, she began co-hosting "صباح الخير يا بحرين" (“Good Morning Bahrain”) with Aisha Abdul Latif. The show had a national reach, and Ahmad would remain an anchor there save for a short withdrawal in 2012.

Career

Television

Theatre

Radio

Film

Awards
She won the 2008 Best Actress in a Radio Drama award in Cairo for her role in الجيران.

External links
 El Cinema page

References

1961 births
Bahraini people of Iraqi descent
Bahraini television actresses
Bahraini stage actresses
Bahraini film actresses
Kuwaiti television actresses
Kuwaiti stage actresses
Kuwaiti film actresses
Living people